Tweeddale, Ettrick and Lauderdale, may refer to:

Tweeddale, Ettrick and Lauderdale (Scottish Parliament constituency)
Tweeddale, Ettrick and Lauderdale (UK Parliament constituency)